This is a list of São Paulo Metro stations. Only urban bus terminals were quoted in this page. (Some stations have nearby bus lines, but they are technically not in the terminal. Tucuruvi (line 1) and Guilhermina-Esperança (line 3) stations, for example.)

Line 1 (Blue)

Obs.: Line 11 (East Express) is being converted into metro standard, but it won't be line 6-Orange.Line 8 doesn't pass through Luz station. Its terminus is at Júlio Prestes Station, two blocks away from Luz station.

Line 2 (Green)

Obs.: The subprefecture of Bela Vista doesn't exist. Bela Vista's district belongs to subprefecture of Sé.
Paulista Avenue is used as a line of division of subprefectures. Consequently, this line is between those subprefectures

Line 3 (Red)

Obs.: Line 11 (East Express) is being converted into metro standard, but it won't be line 6-Orange.Nowadays, Luz station is the terminus of line 11. There are projects to extend it to Barra Funda station.
Bresser's bus terminal is no longer in activity.

Line 4 (Yellow)

Obs.: Line 11 (East Express) is being converted into metro standard, but it won't be line 6-Orange.Line 8 doesn't pass through Luz station. Its terminus is at Júlio Prestes station, two blocks far from Luz station.

Line 5 (Lilac)

Line 15 (Silver)

References 

São Paulo
São Paulo metro stations
Metro stations